The Cesena Championship is a defunct WTA Tour affiliated tennis tournament played in 1992. It was held  in Cesena in Italy and played on indoor carpet courts.

Results

Women's singles

Women's doubles

References
 WTA Results Archive

Carpet court tennis tournaments
Indoor tennis tournaments
Cesena
Defunct tennis tournaments in Italy
1992 establishments in Italy
1992 disestablishments in Italy